Eric Lukeman (11 March 1923 – 18 April 1993) was an Australian cricketer. He played sixteen first-class matches for New South Wales between 1946/47 and 1949/50.

See also
 List of New South Wales representative cricketers

References

External links
 

1923 births
1993 deaths
Australian cricketers
New South Wales cricketers
Cricketers from Sydney